Grand-Camp or Grandcamp may refer to:

Grand-Camp, Eure, in the Eure département in France
Grand-Camp, Seine-Maritime, in the Seine-Maritime département in France
Grandcamp-Maisy, in the Calvados département in France
The SS Grandcamp, a ship that exploded in the Texas City disaster